Pangani Mashariki  is an administrative ward in Pangani District of Tanga Region in Tanzania. The wards is also the seat of the district capital, with the district council building located in the north of the ward. Pangani mashariki is one of 13 wards in Pangani District as of 2012.

The ward is bordered by Pangani Magharibi to the west, Kimang'a ward to the north and Bweni ward across the mouth of Pangani River. The wards also slightly touches the border of Madanga ward to the north west. According to the 2012 census, the ward has a total population of 2,975.

Economy
The ward is the commercial center of the Pangani district. Pangani Mashariki contains the administrative Buildings of both the town of Pangani and the district. Additionally, the ward faces the Zanzibar channel in the Indian Ocean. The ward is home to a number of hotels and also the district's Friday Mosque. The Market is also located in the Sokoni neighborhood of Pangani Mashariki and the Pangani bus terminal which serves the entire district.

Administration and neighborhoods 
The postal code for Pangani mashariki is 21301. Pangani Mashariki is divided into three neighborhoods:
 Kanarani, Pangani Mashariki
 Kumba, Pangani Mashariki
 Sokoni, Pangani Mashariki

Education
Pangani Mashariki ward is home to a number of schools:
Istiqama Nursery School
Funguni Secondary School

Healthcare
Pangani Mashariki is home to the following health centers:
 Pangani District Hospital

References

Wards of Pangani District
Wards of Tanga Region